The 2002 EHF European Women's Handball Championship was held in Denmark from 6–15 December. It was won by Denmark after beating Norway 25–22 in the final match.

Venues
The European Championships was held in the following cities:
Helsinge (Preliminary Group A)
Aarhus (Preliminary Group B, Preliminary Group D, Main Group 1, Final Round)
Farum Arena (Preliminary Group C, Main Group 2)

Qualification

Note: Bold indicates champion for that year. Italic indicates host for that year.

Competition format
Preliminary Round: 16 teams are divided into four groups. They play each other in a single round robin system, so each team plays three matches. A win is worth two points, while a draw is worth one point. The top three teams from each group advance to the Main Round.
Main Round: 12 teams are divided in two groups. They play against the teams they didn't play in the Preliminary Round, so each team plays 3 matches. All points from the Preliminary Round, except the points gained against the 4th place team in the preliminary group, are carried forward into the Main Round. Same round robin rules apply as in the Preliminary Round. Top 2 teams from each group advance to the semifinals, while the third placed team from each group advances to the 5th-6th Place Play-off, and the fourth placed team to the 7th-8th Place Play-off. 
Final Round: 8 teams play in the final weekend of the championships. 3rd place teams from the Main Round play in the 5th-6th Place Play-off, and 4th place team to the 7th-8th Place Play-off. Other teams play in the semifinals. Losers of the semifinals advance to the 3rd-4th Place Play-off, and winners advance to the Final.

Squads

Preliminary round

Group A

Group B

Group C

Group D

Main round

Group I

Group II

Final round

Bracket

Semifinals

Seventh place game

Fifth place game

Third place game

Final

Final ranking and statistics

Final ranking

Source: EHF-Euro.com

All-Star Team
Goalkeeper: 
Left wing: 
Left back: 
Pivot: 
Centre back: 
Right back: 
Right wing: 
Most valuable player: 
Chosen by team officials and EHF experts: EHF

Top goalscorers

Top goalkeepers
(minimum 20% of total shots received by team)

External links
European Handball Federation
Mette's handball corner (Archived 2009-10-22)

European Women's Handball Championship
H
H
Women's handball in Denmark
European Women's Handball Championship
December 2002 sports events in Europe
Sport in Aarhus
2002 in Copenhagen
International sports competitions in Copenhagen